A list of comedy films released in the 1960s.

References

1960s

Comedy